The Forgotten is a thriller novel written by American author David Baldacci. This is the second installment to feature John Puller, a former Army Ranger who served at Iraq and Afghanistan and now works for the U.S. Army’s Criminal Investigations Division. The book was published on November 20, 2012 by Grand Central Publishing.

References

External links

2012 American novels
Novels by David Baldacci
Grand Central Publishing books